Scuola Svizzera di Milano (SSM; ;) is a Swiss international school in Milan, Italy. It serves Kindergarten/Materna through Obserstufe/Liceo (senior high school).

It was first established in 1919.

References

External links

  Scuola Svizzera di Milano
  Scuola Svizzera di Milano

Milano
1919 establishments in Italy
Educational institutions established in 1919